A sport touring motorcycle (sometime a "sports-tourer") is a type of motorcycle that combines the performance of a sport bike with the long-distance capabilities and comfort of a touring motorcycle.

The first sport-tourer is said to be the fully faired 1977 BMW R100RS.   Journalist Peter Egan defines the sport-tourer as a "café racer that doesn't hurt your wrists and a touring bike that doesn't feel like a tank," and identified the R100RS as the first example he owned.

Unlike a sport model, a sport touring model will typically have more wind protection with larger fairings and an adjustable windscreen, a transmission with lower gearing, a shaft drive instead of chain drive, side and/or rear pannier storage systems, a larger alternator for more accessories, heated handlebar grips, remotely adjustable headlights, a larger fuel tank for increased range, and a more upright seating position.  Unlike a full touring model, a sports-tourer will typically have more ride height ground clearance for better cornering, less storage, lower weight, a less relaxed seating position, less room for the rear passenger, and higher overall performance. 

When designing a sport-tourer, some manufacturers make economies by using an existing engine, technology and tooling from their recent sport bikes, rather than creating a dedicated engine design from scratch. Sport-tourer engines could be differently-tuned versions of its sport bike sibling, the emphasis becoming mid-range torque rather than peak horsepower.  This often includes a different cylinder head and exhaust system. For example, the Triumph Sprint motorcycle shared its engine with the Daytona, Speed Triple, and Tiger models; the Kawasaki 1400GTR/Concours 14 shares the basic engine with the Kawasaki Ninja ZX-14; and Ducati's ST4 sport-tourer used the 916's engine.  The sport-tourer Aprilia RST1000 Futura used a differently-tuned version from the Aprilia RSV Mille sport bike. As consumer expectations changed, some sportbikes were redefined (for marketing purposes) as sport touring bikes: the 2000 Kawasaki ZX-6R sportbike became the 2004 ZZR600 with just a change to a fairing bracket.

Rider magazine noted in 2013 that the line between sportbikes and touring motorcycles was becoming blurred "with [touring] horsepower rising higher and higher and lists of standard [sportbike] features growing longer and longer".

See also
 Outline of motorcycles and motorcycling

References

 
Motorcycle classifications
Long-distance motorcycle riding